Ronald Eric Ray (born December 7, 1941) is a former United States Army officer and a recipient of the United States military's highest decoration, the Medal of Honor, for his actions in the Vietnam War.

Early life and career
Born in Cordele, Georgia, on December 7, 1941 (the day of the attack on Pearl Harbor), Ray was one of five brothers. He left high school in 1959 and joined the United States Army from Atlanta for a three-year term of service. Only two months after finishing his enlistment, he rejoined the Special Forces. Ray excelled in his training, such as that for HALO jumping, and was selected for Officer Candidate School. Upon graduation he became a commissioned officer.

Vietnam War
Sent to Vietnam in early June 1966 as a first lieutenant, Ray led a platoon in Company A of the 2nd Battalion, 35th Infantry Regiment, 25th Infantry Division. Shortly after Ray's arrival in the country, his company took part in an operation in the Ia Drang Valley to cut off North Vietnamese Army (NVA) forces entering Vietnam from Cambodia. Ray set up a command post on a small hill, then established listening posts throughout the large area his platoon was tasked with covering. On June 19, one of these listening posts came under intense fire from a company-sized NVA force and was cut off from the rest of the platoon. After learning that no reinforcements were available from his company commander, Ray gathered the rest of his platoon and set off through one mile (1.6 km) of dense jungle to rescue the ten men in the besieged post. With his soldiers firing in "small, frequent bursts" to make themselves appear like a larger force, the unit was able to break through and join the trapped men.

Ray directed his soldiers in the defense of their post as the NVA force regrouped and resumed the attack. When a squad sent out to destroy a hostile machine gun nest became pinned down, Ray stormed the emplacement himself, killing the four gunners with his grenades and shotgun. He then rescued a medic and a wounded man who had come under intense fire by silencing the hostile position with a grenade. As an NVA grenade landed near two of his soldiers, Ray shielded them with his body, suffering shrapnel wounds to his legs and feet. Immediately after, he was shot in the legs by a machine gun, which he then destroyed with his last grenade. Although his lower body was momentarily paralyzed by his injuries, Ray continued to lead the platoon until a lull in the fighting allowed them to withdraw. He intended to stay behind and provide covering fire, but his sergeant carried him to the extraction point after the rest of the unit had escaped.

Ray was evacuated to Pleiku and then Fort Bragg, North Carolina, where he received medical treatment for the next six months. He was promoted to captain and by 1970 was stationed at Fort Benning, Georgia. On May 14, 1970, President Richard Nixon formally presented Ray with the Medal of Honor for his actions in the Ia Drang Valley. Ray retired from the Army for medical reasons in 1980 as a lieutenant colonel, having served a total of three tours in Vietnam.

Civilian life
While still in the Army, Ray graduated from the University of Tampa and received a master's degree in public administration from the University of Oklahoma. After leaving the military, he settled in Florida and established a career as a real estate broker. He founded Ronald E. Ray, Inc., a real estate development and brokerage company.

Through the White House Fellows program, Ray served as a special assistant to the United States Secretary of Commerce from 1974 to 1975. He supported the Republican Party, and worked on the successful presidential campaigns of Ronald Reagan and George H. W. Bush in 1984 and 1988, respectively. In 1989, President Bush appointed him as an assistant secretary for the Department of Veterans Affairs, a position Ray would hold until 1993.

Ray is a former president of the Congressional Medal of Honor Society.

Medal of Honor citation
Ray's official Medal of Honor citation reads:

See also

List of Medal of Honor recipients for the Vietnam War

References

1941 births
Living people
People from Cordele, Georgia
United States Army officers
United States Army personnel of the Vietnam War
United States Army Medal of Honor recipients
University of Tampa alumni
University of Oklahoma alumni
People from Florida
Vietnam War recipients of the Medal of Honor